Taglit-Birthright Israel, also known as Birthright Israel or simply Birthright, is a not-for-profit educational organization that sponsors free ten-day heritage trips to Israel, Jerusalem, and the Golan Heights for young adults of Jewish heritage, aged 18–26.

Taglit is the Hebrew word for 'discovery'. During their trip, participants, most of whom are visiting Israel for the first time, are encouraged to discover new meaning in their personal Jewish identity and connection to Jewish history and culture.

As of 2022, more than 800,000 participants from 68 countries had participated in Birthright Israel. Participation in Birthright Israel has been a major cornerstone in modern Jewish life. Pew Research estimated that by 2020, around 20% of American Jews ages 18–46 have participated in Birthright.

The number of participants averages approximately 45,000 per year, with about 80% from the United States and Canada. After peaking at more than 48,000 participants in 2018, due to COVID and budgetary pressures, the program hosted only 35,000 participants in 2022 and anticipated hosting only 23,500 participants in 2023.

History 

The Birthright Israel program was initiated in 1994 and founded in cooperation with Charles Bronfman and Michael Steinhardt, as well as the Israeli government, private donors, the Jewish Agency for Israel, and Jewish communities around the world. 

By 2007, annual capacity was increased to 20,000 participants a year. That year, the late Sheldon Adelson pledged $25 million to Birthright Israel to take applicants off waiting lists and to increase annual capacity to 37,000 in 2007 and 2008. 

In 2010, Birthright launched an extension program called Birthright Excel. Birthright Excel is a 10-week summer program where students can either create a venture or intern with a business.

In 2022, Birthright Israel merged with Onward Israel, part of the Jewish Agency, which offers programs for young adults to travel to Israel for 6to 10 weeks to live, work and study.

Eligibility 
Eligible individuals are those who have at least one parent of recognized Jewish descent, or who have converted to Judaism through a recognized Jewish movement, and who do not actively practice another religion. They must also be between the ages of 18 to 26, have completed high school, have neither traveled to Israel before on a peer educational trip or study program past the age of 18, nor have lived in Israel past the age of 12 for more than 3-4 months.

Between 2017 and 2022, Birthright raised the upper age limit for eligibility to 32 to reflect the broader cultural shift of young adults delaying major life decisions like getting married and having children.

A Birthright Israel trip includes airfare from major gateway cities, hotels, most meals, all transportation within Israel, and costs associated with touring the country for the ten-day trip. A US$250 deposit is required, which is refunded upon return from the trip. Airfare or transportation from a participant's home to the gateway city is not included, although the trips depart from multiple cities.

Trip organizers 
Trips are organized by different organizations and companies accredited by Birthright Israel, which sets the logistical, educational, and security standards. All groups are led by licensed Israeli tour guides, all groups are accompanied by an armed security guard, and include visits to the Western Wall and Yad Vashem, as well as other sites determined by Birthright Israel. Tours may vary according to age group and the religious background of the participants. Trips may be geared for graduate students, undergraduates at a particular university, participants from a particular city, participants who identify with a particular stream of Judaism, tours for hiking or music enthusiasts, and a diverse array of other interests, such as trips for the LGBTQ community, campus trips and accessibility trips.

El Al, Israel's largest airline company, is the major operator of the trips' flights.

Itinerary 

Registration is conducted twice a year, in the winter and summer, and during each round there are thousands more applicants than spaces available. Trips are conducted throughout most of the year.

A Birthright Israel trip includes airfare from major cities, hotel accommodation, two meals per day, security, all transportation within Israel, and other costs associated with touring the country during the ten-day trip.

Tours travel throughout Israel and Jerusalem to religious and cultural sites, including the Western Wall, and the Dead Sea. Trips also often include a Mega Event, which unites thousands of participants from around the world together with Israelis for a celebration featuring speeches by dignitaries and musical performances.

A major feature of the tours is a 5- to 10-day mifgash (Hebrew for 'encounter') with Israeli peers, usually soldiers serving in the Israel Defense Forces, who join the tour. The stated purpose for the mifgash is for the participants and the soldiers to get to know each other and to better understand each other's world view and Jewish identity. Guided discussion sessions explore topics such as the Jewish tradition in the modern world, how Jewish life in Israel differs from Jewish life abroad, and how mandatory military service impacts young Israelis' perceptions of service and commitment to their country. More than 115,000 Israelis have participated in the program since 2000.

Participants have the option to extend their plane ticket for up to three months to explore Israel and the region. The optional extension is not part of the Birthright trip, and the participant is in that time like any tourist.

Security measures 
Security policies in place during the trip "ensure a comprehensive safety umbrella", as follows:

 No travel to the West Bank, Gaza, or East Jerusalem other than the Jewish Quarter of the Old City
 Participants in each group remain together at all times and follow a set schedule of activities
 Participants do not leave the groups to travel, explore or visit with Israelis on their own during the ten-day trip
 Public transportation is not allowed at any time
 At least one highly trained, armed escort accompanies each group throughout the entire trip

Cost and Funding 
Each trip cost approximately $4,500 as of 2020. According to Birthright Israel, 67% of funding comes from individual donors, 27% from the Israeli government, 3% from Jewish federations, and 3% from the Jewish Agency.

The largest individual donor is the Adelsons, who had given more than $250 million to Birthright Israel by 2015. Other major donors include prominent philanthropists Charles Bronfman, Edgar Bronfman, Sr., Daniel Och, Marlene Post, Lynn Schusterman, and Michael Steinhardt.The program also receives funding from the German government, through the Conference on Jewish Material Claims Against Germany.

Alumni programs
Between 2007 and 2015, Birthright NEXT was a program intended to act as a post-trip follow-up organization to keep youth involved in local Jewish communities after visiting Israel via Birthright. One NEXT initiative was I.D., in which Birthright Israel alumni would perform monologues based on their experiences.

In early 2009 it split into a separate entity, but the two organizations shared most board members. Ultimately, a lack of funding for alumni programs in the face of an increased emphasis on youth Israel trips led NEXT to be shut down by 2015.

Impact

Impact on Jewish identity
Leonard Saxe of Brandeis University's Cohen Center for Modern Jewish Studies has evaluated the program's impact since its inception in 1999. As of 2020, findings include:

 Birthright participants were 16 percentage points more likely to have a Jewish spouse or partner than similar nonparticipants
 Birthright increased participants’ likelihood of engagement in Jewish life
 One out of four Birthright participants ends up marrying another Birthright participant.

Economic benefit to Israel
According to the organization, Birthright Israel has contributed more than 2 billion NIS to the Israeli economy.

Similar trips 
Birthright Israel has inspired similar heritage programs for other diasporas with similar goals, including Birthright Armenia for the Armenian diaspora, ReConnect Hungary for young adults of the Hungarian diaspora in the U.S. and Canada, Birthright Greece for the Greek diaspora, and Domovina Birthright Program for Croatians. Birthright also loosely inspired CubaOne Foundation for Cuban-Americans and Birthright Africa for young Americans of African descent, which was founded in 2015.

Criticism 
The Birthright Israel program has been criticized for its pre-trip screening process, such as allegedly excluding applicants for political reasons.

The pro-Palestinian Jewish Voice for Peace runs a campaign called Return the Birthright, which criticizes the Birthright Israel program and urges young Jews to boycott it, stating: "it's unjust that we get a free Birthright trip, while Palestinian refugees can't return to their homes".

Birthright Unplugged was founded in 2014 to counterbalance Birthright Israel, with the goal of exposing Jewish and non-Jewish visitors to Palestinian communities inside and outside of Israel.

See also

 Diaspora politics
 Diaspora politics in the United States
 Jewish diaspora
 Jewish Agency for Israel
 Jewish education
 Nefesh B'Nefesh
 Tourism in Israel
 Heritage tourism
 Genealogy tourism
 Youth aliyah
 Hakhshara
 Youth village

References

External links 

 
 Official Foundation website

Zionist organizations
Zionism in the United States
Zionism in Canada
Zionist youth movements
Tourism in Israel
Jewish Agency for Israel
Organizations established in 1994
Youth organizations based in New York (state)
1994 establishments in New York (state)